Solon is the surname of:

 Camille Solon (1877–1960), British muralist and ceramist, son of Marc-Louis Solon
 Ewen Solon (1917–1985), New Zealand-born actor
 John Solon (1842–1921), American politician
 Jose Solon, Filipino politician
 Laura Solon (born 1979), English screenwriter, comedian and actress
 Léon-Victor Solon (1873–1957), English painter, ceramist and graphic artist, son of Marc-Louis Solon
 Lorin Solon (1892–1967), American college football player
 Marc-Louis Solon (1835–1913), French porcelain artist
 Sam Solon (1931–2001), American politician
 Sheila Solon (born c. 1959), American politician
 Steve Solon, Filipino politician first elected Governor of the province of Sarangani in 2013
 Thomas F. Solon (1853–1923), American businessman and politician
 Vivian Solon (born 1962), Australian who was unlawfully deported to the Philippines in 2001
 Yvonne Prettner Solon (born 1946), American politician, former lieutenant governor of Minnesota
 Florentino Solon (1931–2020), Filipino nutritionist and politician